Bostra pulverealis is a species of snout moth in the genus Bostra. It was described by George Hampson in 1916. It is found on the Bonin Islands of Japan.

References

Moths described in 1916
Pyralini
Moths of Japan